The Department of Peace Studies is an academic department established in 1973 at the University of Bradford in Bradford, United Kingdom. It was the first peace studies department established in any British university. , it claims to be the world's largest university research centre for the study of peace and conflict. Activities of the centre include studies of peace processes, international relations, security studies, conflict resolution, development and teaching in these fields.

Notable alumni and students
 Saeb Erekat, Palestinian politician and diplomat
 Lindis Percy, peace activist.
 Lloyd Russell-Moyle, Labour MP.
 Robert Swindells, author.
 Sadegh Zibakalam (PhD 1989), Iranian professor, writer and political analyst.

Past and present faculty 
Head of Department: P. B. Anand
 Haleh Afshar
 Gabor Batonyi
 Adam Curle
 Baruch Hirson
 Aki Orr
 Munro Price
 Michael Randle
 Saleem Shahzad
 Hilary Wainwright

Tolstoy Cup 

The Tolstoy Cup is an annual football match played between the students of the Department of Peace Studies at the University of Bradford and the Department of War Studies at King's College London since 1995. The rivalry between 'Peace Studies' and 'War Studies' was featured on the Financial Times list of "Great college sports rivalries". The competition is named after War and Peace, the 1869 novel written by the Russian author Leo Tolstoy. The "trophy" is a framed copy of the book. It is kept by the department of the current winners.

References

External links
 Official website of the Department of Peace Studies and International Development

University of Bradford
1973 establishments in England
1973 establishments in the United Kingdom
Education in Bradford
Peace and conflict studies
Schools of international relations